The United States Federal Reserve Statistical Release H.15 is a weekly publication (with daily updates) of the Federal Reserve System of selected market interest rates.

Many residential mortgage loans are indexed to the one-year treasury rate published in the H.15 release.

Published rates
The H.15 covers the following rates, in varying maturities:

Federal funds
Commercial paper
Certificates of deposit
Eurodollar deposits
Bank prime loans
Discount window
United States Treasury Bills
United States Treasury Notes
United States Treasury Bonds
United States Treasury Inflation Protected Securities
Interest rate swaps
Corporate bonds
Municipal bonds
Residential mortgage loans

References

External links
Digitized historical releases of the H.15

Federal Reserve System